Abecedarians were an American, Los Angeles-based post-punk trio, active in the mid to late 1980s. The lineup consisted of Chris Manecke (guitar, vocals, keyboards), Kevin Dolan (drums) and John Blake (bass). They specialized in sparse, guitar-driven post-punk, though their most well-known song, "Smiling Monarchs", is alternative dance in the vein of New Order, and was in fact mixed by that band's guitar player and vocalist, Bernard Sumner.

Discography

Singles
"Smiling Monarchs" (6:34) / "Benway's Carnival" (5:08) (12", Factory UK FAC-117, April 1985)

Albums 
Eureka (mini-LP, Southwest Audio Reproductions 7-PV-50772, 1986)
Ghosts / Soil / Beneath The City Of The Hedonistic Bohemians // I Glide/ Mice & Coconut Tree / The Misery Of Cities
Reissued by Caroline (CAROL-1342, 1987) with different sleeve and "The Other Side Of The Fence" replacing "Beneath The City Of The Hedonistic Bohemians"
Reissued by Pylon (2012), CD and 2×LP: Ghosts / Soil / Beneath The City Of The Hedonistic Bohemians // I Glide / Mice & Coconut Tree / Misery Of Cities /// Smiling Monarchs / Benway's Carnival / Switch / Other Side Of The Fence // They Said Tomorrow / Wildflower / John's Pop / Spaghetti Western
 Resin (LP, Caroline CAROL-1343, 1988)
 Dinner / Spaghetti Western / Where Whitie Ain't Allowed / Wild Flowers Grow From The Trash // Press Escape / Laugh At Yourself / Sufferin' Tarnation / Panic In Needle Park
 AB-CD (CD, Caroline CAROL-CD-1343, 1988)
 Ghosts (6:42) / Soil (7:00) / The Other Side Of The Fence (4:09) / I Glide (7:32) / Mice & Coconut Tree (4:59) / Smiling Monarchs (6:48) / Dinner (4:49) / Spaghetti Western (6:25) / Where Whitie Ain't Allowed (3:54) / Press Escape (5:01) / Laugh At Yourself (3:37) / Surf Western (3:17) / Panic In Needle Park (6:55)
CD version of Resin with previously released tracks
The Other Side Of The Fence (2×10", Independent Project Records IP-031/032, 1990)
 Beneath The City Of The Hedonistic Bohemians / Ghosts / John's Pop // Come Out / Classic / Spaghetti Western /// Switch / Where's Karen / Soil // The Other Side Of The Fence / Wildflower / They Said Tomorrow
 early recordings, from 1983 to 1985

Compilation albums 
 "They Said Tomorrow" - L.A. Mantra II (cassette, Trance Port Tapes, 1984)
 reissued Calypso Now 1985
 "They Said Tomorrow" - Scream: The Compilation LP, Geffen Records, 1987)
 "Smiling Monarchs" - Hardest Hits Volume Two (CD, SPG Music Productions Ltd., 1992)
 "Smiling Monarchs" - Voices In The Air (CD, Wavestation, 1993)
 "Smiling Monarchs" - Too Young To Know, Too Wild To Care...1978–1992 The Factory Story Part One  (CD, London, 1997)
 "Smiling Monarchs" - Auteur Labels: Factory Records 1984 (CD, Les Temps Modernes, 2009)
 "Benway's Carnival" - Auteur Labels: Independent Project Records (CD, Les Temps Modernes, 2010)

Appearances 
 "Soil" (instrumental edit) - Appears as a track accompanying the 'Waimea Bay' bigwave contest (Billabong Pro) section of the surf film Billabong: Surf Into Summer (1986/87) at approx 19:48 mins in. (Other artists included in the film include TSOL and Agent Orange)

References

External links 
 Abecedarians at MySpace

Factory Records artists
American experimental musical groups
American post-punk music groups
American new wave musical groups
Caroline Records artists
Musical groups established in 1983